Theodore Lee Falcon (born August 30, 1955) is a former American football guard and tackle. He played for the New England Patriots from 1978 to 1979 and for the New York Giants in 1980.

References

1955 births
Living people
American football offensive guards
American football offensive tackles
Minot State Beavers football players
Montana Grizzlies football players
New England Patriots players
New York Giants players
Arizona Wranglers players